The major administrative subdivisions of Kaunas, Lithuania, are elderates ("eldership").
They are further partitioned into traditional heighborhoods of two levels: "city parts" (miesto dalys) and "city territories" (miesto teritorijos).

Subdivision
According to the 2001 general plan, the city was subdivided into 10 elderates and 32 city parts as shown in the table.

Currently Kaunas city municipality has 11 elderates.

Notes

References

External links
KAUNO MIESTO BENDRASIS PLANAS KONCEPCIJA. DALIS: STRATEGINIO PASEKMIŲ APLINKAI VERTINIMO APIMTIES NUSTATYMO DOKUMENTAS (Kaunas city general plan concept. Part: Strategic environmental scope determination document), Kaunas, 20122 (retrieved October 6, 2022)
Kauno miesto savivaldybės žemėlapis (Kaunas city municipality map), geoportal.lt, variable resolution; no boundaries marked 
Kauno seniūnijos, Various maps

Kaunas